Grisebachianthus is a genus of Cuban flowering plants in the family Asteraceae.

The genus is named in honor of German botanist August Heinrich Rudolf Grisebach, 1814–1879.

 Species
All species are endemic to Cuba.

References

Asteraceae genera
Eupatorieae
Flora of Cuba